This article lists the etymologies of the names of the provinces and territories of Canada.

Provinces and territories

Historical regions
Acadia: origin disputed:
 Credited to Florentine navigator Giovanni da Verrazzano, who first named a region around Chesapeake Bay Archadia (Arcadia) in 1524 because of "the beauty of its trees", according to his diary. Cartographers began using the name Arcadia to refer to areas progressively farther north until it referred to the French holdings in maritime Canada (particularly Nova Scotia). The -r- also began to disappear from the name on early maps, resulting in the current Acadia.
 Possibly derived from the Míkmaq word , pronounced roughly "agadik", meaning "place", which French-speakers spelled as -cadie in place names such as Shubenacadie and Tracadie, possibly coincidentally.
Nunatsiavut: Inuktitut, meaning "our beautiful land".

See also

Locations in Canada with an English name
List of Canadian place names of Ukrainian origin
List of place names in Canada of Aboriginal origin
 List of etymologies of country subdivision names
 Name of Canada
Origins of names of cities in Canada
Scottish place names in Canada

References

Further reading
 

province
etymologies
Canada